Westward Ho is a 1942 American Western "Three Mesquiteers" B-movie directed by John English and starring Bob Steele, Tom Tyler, and Rufe Davis.

Cast 
 Bob Steele as Tucson Smith
 Tom Tyler as Stony Brooke
 Rufe Davis as Lullaby Joslin
 Evelyn Brent as Mrs. Healey
 Donald Curtis as Rick West
 Lois Collier as Anne Henderson
 Emmett Lynn as Sheriff
 John James as Jimmy Henderson
 Tom Seidel as Wayne Henderson
 Jack Kirk as Deputy
 Budd Buster as Henchman Coffee

References

External links 

1942 films
1942 Western (genre) films
American Western (genre) films
American black-and-white films
Films directed by John English
Republic Pictures films
Three Mesquiteers films
1940s English-language films
1940s American films